Hamer-Młyn (Kashubian: Hamer Młin; German until 1945: Hammermühle) is a village in the administrative district of Gmina Lipnica, within Bytów County, Pomeranian Voivodeship, in northern Poland. The village has a population of 12.

References

Villages in Bytów County